The 2007–08 Umaglesi Liga was the nineteenth season of top-tier football in Georgia. It began on 10 August 2007 and ended on 20 May 2008. Olimpi Rustavi were the defending champions.

Locations

League table

Results

Relegation play-offs

See also
2007–08 Pirveli Liga
2007–08 Georgian Cup

References
Georgia - List of final tables (RSSSF)

Erovnuli Liga seasons
1
Georgia